Čermany is a municipality in the Topoľčany District of the Nitra Region, Slovakia. In 2011 had a population of 383 inhabitants.

See also
 List of municipalities and towns in Slovakia

References

Genealogical resources
The records for genealogical research are available at the state archive "Statny Archiv in Nitra, Slovakia"
 Roman Catholic church records (births/marriages/deaths): 1727-1896 (parish A)
 Lutheran church records (births/marriages/deaths): 1708-1895 (parish B)

External links
Cermany
Official homepage of parish Čermany
Surnames of living people in Cermany

Villages and municipalities in Topoľčany District